The Mississippi Federation of Women's Clubs Headquarters houses the Mississippi Federation of Women's Clubs (MS FWC). It was constructed in 1936 by the Works Progress Administration (WPA).

Mississippi Federation of Women's Clubs
The Mississippi Federation of Women's Clubs (MS FWC) is a woman's club founded in 1898. It has been a member of the General Federation of Women's Clubs since 1904. It continues to maintain the headquarters in Jackson.

Building
The Mississippi Federation of Women's Clubs Headquarters was built in 1936 as a Works Progress Administration project. It was designed by Robert W. Naef and Associates in the Georgian-Revival style. It was listed as a Mississippi Landmark in 1986 and on the National Register of Historic Places in 1988.

References

Organizations established in 1898
Women's clubs in the United States
Women's club buildings
Clubhouses on the National Register of Historic Places in Mississippi
Works Progress Administration in Mississippi
Buildings and structures completed in 1936
National Register of Historic Places in Jackson, Mississippi
History of women in Mississippi